Osvaldo Blasi (5 February 1928 – 8 July 2012) was an Argentine wrestler. He competed in the men's freestyle lightweight at the 1952 Summer Olympics.

References

External links
 

1928 births
2012 deaths
Argentine male sport wrestlers
Olympic wrestlers of Argentina
Wrestlers at the 1952 Summer Olympics
Place of birth missing
Wrestlers at the 1951 Pan American Games
Pan American Games silver medalists for Argentina
Pan American Games medalists in wrestling
Medalists at the 1951 Pan American Games
20th-century Argentine people
21st-century Argentine people